William or Bill Warner may refer to:

William Warner (poet) (c. 1558–1609), English poet
William H. Warner (1812–1849), officer in the U.S. Army's Corps of Topographical Engineers
William Smith Warner (1817–1897), American politician
William Warner (Missouri politician) (1840–1916), American politician
William Warner (cricketer) (1844–1871), English cricketer
William John Warner or Cheiro (1866–1936), Irish astrologer and palmist
William Warner (Conservative politician) (1867–1950), British Army officer and politician
Bill Warner (American football) (1881–1944), American football player and coach
W. Lloyd Warner (1898–1970), American anthropologist
William W. Warner (1920–2008), American author, winner of a Pulitzer Prize in 1977
Bill Warner (motorcyclist) (1969–2013), American motorcycle racer
William Warner (Michigan politician, born 1806) (1806–?), American politician
William Warner (Michigan politician, born 1812) (1812–1868), American politician

See also 
 Bill Warner (disambiguation)
 Warner (surname)